Daotian is a town in Shouguang, Weifang, Shandong Province, China.

References

Cities in Shandong
Weifang